The Arellano University High School offers grades 7 to 12 and is composed of the Junior High and the Senior High.

Locations
 Juan Sumulong High School is the laboratory high school of the College of Education in Manila.
 Andres Bonifacio High School is the laboratory high school of the College of Education in Pasig.
 Jose Abad Santos High School is the laboratory high school of the College of Education in Pasay.
 Jose Rizal High School and Elisa Esguera High School is the laboratory high school of the College of Education in Malabon.
 Apolinario Mabini High School is one of the two university high schools of AU.
 Plaridel High School is one of the two university high schools of AU.

References

External links
 Arellano University website

Education in Sampaloc, Manila
Schools in Pasig
Schools in Pasay
Schools in Malabon
Schools in Mandaluyong
Laboratory schools in the Philippines
University-affiliated schools in the Philippines
High schools in Metro Manila
Educational institutions established in 1945
1945 establishments in the Philippines